Laxton is a surname that was prominent in the Anglo-Saxon period of English history. During this era many in the populace would take their surname from the region in which they resided. Laxton, the surname, is associated with the location of Laxton, which is in the Yorkshire area of North East England, and has an equal historical association in Nottinghamshire, pre-dating the 1066 invasion of William the Conqueror and subsequent full country census. There is a village called Laxton in Nottinghamshire.

List of persons with the surname
 Brett Laxton – Major League Baseball pitcher
 Charlie Laxton – Australian rules footballer
 Gordon Laxton – Canadian ice hockey goaltender
 Harry Laxton – Australian rules footballer
 James Laxton – American cinematographer
 Richard Laxton – British film director
 Robert Laxton – Former Labour MP for Derby North
 Reg and Cyril Laxton – British swimming and diving coaches
 William Laxton – British surveyor and author
 William Laxton – Lord Mayor of London during the reign of Henry VIII
  Kevin Laxton - Guitar Player for Sweltering Giblets (Irish Jazz Fusion band)
 Edward and William Laxton - English horticulturists

References

 

English toponymic surnames